Satish Kumar (born 9 August 1936) is an Indian British activist and speaker. He has been a Jain monk, nuclear disarmament advocate and pacifist. Now living in England, Kumar is founder and Director of Programmes of the Schumacher College international center for ecological studies, and is Editor Emeritus of Resurgence & Ecologist magazine. His most notable accomplishment is the completion, together with a companion, E. P. Menon, of a peace walk of over 8,000 miles in June 1962 for two and a half years, from New Delhi to Moscow, Paris, London, and Washington, D.C., the capitals of the world's earliest nuclear-armed countries. He insists that reverence for nature should be at the heart of every political and social debate.

Defending criticism that his goals are unrealistic, he has said,

Early life 
Kumar was born in Sri Dungargarh, Rajasthan, India. At the age of 9, he left his family and became a Jain monk. At 18, after reading a book by Mahatma Gandhi, he ran away from the mendicant order, to become a student of Vinoba Bhave, an eminent disciple of Gandhi and his nonviolence and land reform ideas.

Peace walk 
Inspired by Bertrand Russell's civil disobedience against the atomic bomb, in June 1962 Kumar and his friend E. P. Menon decided to dedicate themselves to undertaking a peace walk from India to the four capitals of the nuclear world: Moscow, Paris, London, and Washington D.C. and decided to carry no money on their trip. They called it a 'Pilgrimage for peace' and it took two and a half years.

Vinoba Bhave gave the young men two 'gifts'. One was to be penniless wherever they walked. The other was to be vegetarian. They first travelled through Pakistan, where they met great kindness from a country with a huge historic conflict and antipathy towards India. Leaving Pakistan via the Khyber Pass, they continued through Afghanistan, Iran, Armenia, Georgia, and the Caucasus Mountains. They visited Moscow, Paris, London, and Washington, D.C. Travelling on foot and carrying no money, Kumar and his companion would stay with anyone who offered them food or shelter. 

While on their way to Moscow they met two women outside a tea factory. After explaining what they were doing one of the women gave them four packets of tea, one to be delivered to each of the leaders of the four nuclear powers and to also deliver a message, "when you think you need to press the button, stop for a minute and have a fresh cup of tea". This further inspired their journey and became in part the reason for it.  They eventually delivered 'peace tea' to the leaders of four of the nuclear powers. The journey is chronicled in Kumar's book, No Destination: Autobiography of a Pilgrim.

Professional career

Editor 
Between 1973 and 2016, Kumar was editor of Resurgence & Ecologist (combining the former Resurgence magazine, which had been described as the artistic and spiritual flagship of the green movement, with The Ecologist). He contributed an essay to The Society for Curious Thought entitled "Focus on Food". He has also been a contributor to the BBC's "Thought for the Day" strand on the Today programme, and also appeared on Desert Island Discs. Kumar was interviewed by Richard Dawkins in his 'Slaves to Superstition' episode of the documentary The Enemies of Reason, investigating the prevalence of unscientific beliefs in modern society.  He also made a film, Earth Pilgrim, for BBC2's Natural History Series.

We Are One 
Kumar was one of the contributors for writing the book, We Are One: A Celebration of Tribal Peoples, released in October 2009. The book explores the culture of peoples around the world, portraying both its diversity and the threats it faces. It contains a collection of statements from tribal people, photographs, and essays from international authors, campaigners, politicians, philosophers, poets, artists, journalists, anthropologists, environmentalists and photojournalists. The royalties from the sale of this book go to the indigenous rights organization, Survival International.

Family life 
Kumar, a recipient of the Jamnalal Bajaj International Award, settled in England in 1973. He lives a simple life in Hartland, Devon, with his partner June Mitchell, their son Mukti Kumar Mitchell, and their daughter Maya Kumar Mitchell.

Politics 

Prior to the 2015 UK general election, he was one of several celebrities who endorsed the parliamentary candidacy of the Green Party's Caroline Lucas.

Books 
 No Destination: Autobiography of a Pilgrim (2014) [2004] [1978], Green Books, 
 You Are, Therefore I Am: A Declaration of Dependence (2002), Green Books, 
 Images of Earth and Spirit: A Resurgence anthology Edited by John Lane and Satish Kumar (2003), Green Books, 
 The Intimate and the Ultimate Vinoba Bhave, Edited by Satish Kumar (2004), Green Books, 
 The Buddha and the Terrorist: The Story of Angulimala (2006), Algonquin Books, 
 Spiritual Compass: The Three Qualities of Life (2008), Green Books/Finch Publishing, 
 Earth Pilgrim in conversation with Echann Deravy and Maya Kumar Mitchell (2009), Green Books, 
 Soul, Soil, Society: a New Trinity for our Time (2013), Leaping Hare Press, 
 Elegant Simplicity: the Art of Living Well (2019), New Society Publishers, 
 Pilgrimage for Peace: the Long Walk from India to Washington (2021), Green Books,

References

External links 
 Biography on the Resurgence website
 Interview on the In Context website
 Satish Kumar's presentation as a part of the Royal Institute of British Architects International Dialogues: Architecture and Climate Change
 The E F Schumacher Centenary Lecture at the Temenos Academy, 13 September 2011.

1936 births
Living people
Indian emigrants to England
Indian non-fiction environmental writers
Indian Jain monks
20th-century Indian Jains
20th-century Jain monks
20th-century Indian monks
British magazine editors
Indian magazine editors
Indian male writers
Nonviolence advocates
People from Bikaner district
Simple living advocates
Jain pacifists
British anti–nuclear weapons activists
British Jains
British pacifists
Indian pacifists
Indian anti–nuclear weapons activists
Indian political writers
20th-century Indian non-fiction writers
Anti-consumerists
Neo-Luddites
Writers from Rajasthan
Activists from Rajasthan